Melko has several meanings:
Paul Melko, American science-fiction author
Morgoth, sometimes referred to as Melko/Melkor, in J. R. R. Tolkien's Middle-earth legendarium